Nootamaa is a small, uninhabited island in the Baltic Sea belonging to the country of Estonia. It marks the westernmost part of Estonia's territorial boundary.

Nootamaa has an area of 59,000 sq metres and lies off the extreme western coast of the island of Saaremaa. Together with some other forty islands and islets, it makes up the Vilsandi National Park - an area of ecological protection for birds.

Nootamaa belongs administratively to the rural village of Atla in Lääne-Saare Parish, Saare County. The island is depicted on the Estonian two euro coin.

See also
 List of islands of Estonia

References

External links
SatelliteViews.net

Estonian islands in the Baltic
Saaremaa Parish
Extreme points of Estonia